Allahabad Municipal Corporation (officially known as Prayagraj Municipal Corporation) is the governing civic body of Allahabad (Prayagraj) city in Uttar Pradesh. It is responsible for the civic infrastructure and administration of the city. It was established in 1863 as the Municipal Board of Allahabad under the act of 26 of 1850. The board was changed to corporation in 1959.

References

External links
Allahabad Municipal Corporation

Municipal corporations in Uttar Pradesh
Government of Allahabad
1863 establishments in India
1959 establishments in Uttar Pradesh